The Royal Winnipeg Ballet is Canada's oldest ballet company and the longest continuously operating ballet company in North America.

History

It was founded in 1939 as the "Winnipeg Ballet Club" by Gweneth Lloyd and Betty Farrally (who also founded the ballet school The Canadian School of Ballet in British Columbia). The name was changed to the "Winnipeg Ballet" in 1941 and the company began touring Canada in 1945. In 1948, with the initiative of the Winnipeg Ballet, the Canadian Ballet Festival was formed.

The Royal Winnipeg Ballet was granted its royal title in 1953, the first granted under the reign of Queen Elizabeth II. It completed its first American tour in 1954. In June that year the RWB's rented premises were devastated by fire; the company's entire stock of costumes, original music, choreographic scores and sets were destroyed. Conductor Eric Wild served as the company's music director from 1955 to 1962.

The company solidified its reputation under the artistic directorship of Saskatchewan-born Arnold Spohr from 1958 to 1988. Spohr, who first joined the company as a dancer in 1945, during his tenure maintained a strong focus on developing Canadian talent, and, at the same time, he developed the RWB as an international touring company, and actively engaged with choreographers and dancers from around the world to expand the ballet.

Spohr was succeeded by RWB principal dancer Henny Jurriëns who was formerly assistant to Dutch National Ballet director Rudi van Dantzig. Jurriëns, however, died in a car accident in April 1989. In 1990 John Meehan from American Ballet Theatre became artistic director but left in 1993 following the company's persistent financial difficulties. William Whitener, formerly the artistic director of Les Ballets Jazz de Montréal, was chosen to succeed Meehan. Continuing financial problems and dancer "unrest", Whitener was released in less than two years later.

André Lewis was appointed in 1996 as artistic director. Lewis' decades-long association with the RWB began in 1975 when he was accepted into the Professional Division at the Royal Winnipeg Ballet School. In 1979, he was joined the Royal Winnipeg Ballet Company and performed as a dancer with the RWB until 1990. Lewis' roles include: Gunther in Nutcracker; Mercutio in Romeo and Juliet; and Jamie Paul in The Ecstasy of Rita Joe. Company Music Director and Conductor is Tad Biernacki and Senior Ballet Master is Johnny W. Chang.

In 1981 the company participated alongside the National Ballet of Canada, Les Grands Ballets Canadiens, le Groupe de la Place Royale, the Danny Grossman Dance Company, the Toronto Dance Theatre, Winnipeg Contemporary Dancers and the Anna Wyman Dance Theatre in the Canadian Dance Spectacular, a dance show at Ottawa's National Arts Centre which was filmed by the National Film Board of Canada for the 1982 documentary film Gala.

The dancer most associated with the RWB has been Evelyn Hart; it also included many other notable dancers including Mikhail Baryshnikov. Born in Toronto, Ontario, in 1956, Hart made her professional debut with the RWB in 1976. In 1980, she was awarded the bronze medal at the World Ballet Concours in Japan, and the gold medal at the Varna International Ballet Competition where she also received the Exceptional Artistic Achievement Award. Both medals were awarded for her performance of Belong pas de deux, created by internationally acclaimed choreographer Norbert Vesak as part of his work What To Do Till the Messiah Comes. Hart was awarded the Order of Canada in 1983. She left the RWB in 2005. David Peregrine, Hart's long-time partner, joined the Royal Winnipeg Ballet as a member of the corps in 1975 and became a soloist three years later and principal dancer in 1980; that year the pair both performed in Varna. Peregrine was made an officer of the Order of Canada in 1986.

Other Honorable mentions for dancers include principal Laura Graham, who was awarded a Silver medal at the 14th Varna International Ballet Competition in 1990.  Her team included principal Steven Hyde, receiving a best non-competing partner honor, and soloist Mark Godden receiving best new choreography for 'Myth'.  Principal dancer Suzanne Rubio followed in 1991 winning a Bronze medal at the 2nd Helsinki International Ballet Competition.

In 1992, Gweneth Lloyd, co-founder of the company, became the first recipient of the Governor General's Performing Arts Award for Lifetime Artistic Achievement.

The company spends 20 or more weeks a year on the road, presenting more than 100 performances every year in both large and small centres. The company also mounts four productions a year in Winnipeg's performing arts venue, the Centennial Concert Hall.

Royal Winnipeg Ballet School

The Royal Winnipeg Ballet School is composed of two divisions, Recreational and Professional, and is home to the more than 1,500 students annually. The current building opened in January 1988, and features 12 spacious, sprung-floor studios, and a 224-seat performance space.

The Royal Winnipeg Ballet School, Recreational Division provides training and instruction to students age 3+ in various disciplines including Ballet, Tap, Jazz, Lyrical/Contemporary, Pointe, Musical Theatre, Modern, Creative Movement and Hip Hop. The Recreational Division features an audition-only competitive Dance Ensemble program for high level Junior to Senior students. The school also offers an Intensive Training Program for students who have shown ability and dedication for more intense, specialized training in classical ballet. In this program, numerous ballet classes are supported with additional classes such as pointe, RWB School Dance Ensemble performance groups, conditioning and modern. Students are prepared using the Cecchetti method for classical ballet exams.

Alumni have gone onto careers on Broadway, Rainbow Stage and Alvin Ailey American Dance Theatre and have continued their education with Arts Umbrella, Goh Ballet, Alberta Ballet, Boston Conservatory and the School of Contemporary Dancers. Students work closely with RWB School Artistic faculty, including award-winning choreographers, and perform new works in festivals and competitions.

The Royal Winnipeg Ballet School, Professional Division is an exclusive, full-time classical ballet training program for students in grades 6 through 12. The school includes approximately 72 young dancers, selected from around the world, and graduates have international careers in top companies in Canada and abroad. The Professional Division instructs students using the Vaganova method of ballet.

David Lee Moroni, a former principal dancer with the RWB, headed the company's professional training program from 1970 to 2003. Moroni's notable students included: Evelyn Hart, David Peregrine, André Lewis, Tara Birtwhistle, and Jennifer Welsman. In 1990 Moroni received the Order of Canada.

From 2003 until 2016, Arlene Minkhorst was Director of the school; in 2016, Stéphane Léonard assumed the role. Since 2015, Suzanne André has been the Principal of the Professional Division, and since 2016, Nicole Kepp has been the Principal of the Recreational Division.

Choreography
In 2002, The Royal Winnipeg Ballet's interpretation of the story of Dracula, choreographed by Mark Godden, was filmed in a made for television titled Dracula: Pages from a Virgin's Diary directed by Guy Maddin. The film was later released theatrically. Godden, who became the RWB's first choreographer in residence in 1991, has created several other major works for the company, including: Angels in the Architecture; Dame Aux Fruits; A Darkness Between Us; Shepherd's Wake; and Svengali

Canada's Royal Winnipeg Ballet is the first organization to present a theatrical or dance production of the works of Leonard Cohen. During the RWB tenure of Artistic Director Arnold Spohr (1958–1988), in Summer 1970, Brian Macdonald choreographed The Shining People of Leonard Cohen which debuted in Paris. That July, it was staged at Canada's National Arts Centre in Ottawa – with eclectic band Lighthouse opening the show.

In 2002, the Royal Winnipeg Ballet commissioned American choreographer Val Caniparoli for the first full-length ballet, entitled Val Caniparoli's A Cinderella Story using the music of composer Richard Rodgers. "The story was familiar, yet original; the choreography sleek, yet classical; the music, a fresh-sounding amalgam of jazz riffs and swirls, based on the themes of one vintage composer. And it is the belle of the ball".

In May 2012, the company presented the World Premiere of The Doorway - Scenes from Leonard Cohen, a contemporary dance piece based on the words and music of Cohen, choreographed by Jorden Morris. Morris' previous works for the RWB include the highly successful full-length classical ballet Peter Pan (2006) and Moulin Rouge - The Ballet (2009 premiere). In this newest ballet, consisting of five vignettes, Cohen's recorded songs and interviews blend with live music. Hallelujah is performed by musician Allison Crowe (voice and piano) and dancers Sophia Lee and Jo-Ann Sundermeier alternating dates. In November 2012 the RWB toured The Doorway to great acclaim with three live song performances by Crowe.

Dancers

Dancers in the Royal Winnipeg Ballet's 2022-2023 season include:

Principals

Soloists

Second Soloists

Corps de Ballet

Apprentices

See also
Canadian organizations with royal patronage
Monarchy in Manitoba

References

External links

Royal Winnipeg Ballet at The Canadian Encyclopedia
NY Times of Ruthanna Boris by Jack Anderson, 8 January 2007
Royal Winnipeg Ballet fonds (R10438) at Library and Archives Canada. The fonds consists of 20 posters from the Royal Winnipeg Ballet advertising ballets and plays.

 
Winnipeg Ballet, Royal
Culture of Winnipeg
Companies based in Winnipeg
1939 establishments in Manitoba
Performing groups established in 1939